"Det snurrar i min skalle" ("It's spinning in my head") is a single from Swedish indie-techno outfit Familjen from the 2007 album Det snurrar i min skalle. It was released in 2007 under various labels including Adrian Recordings and Hybris in Sweden, Telle in Norway, A:Larm in Denmark, and Creative Vibes in Australia.

Video
The video was named by Pitchfork Media as one of the best music videos of 2007. It also won a grammy in Sweden for best video.

Charts
The single listed for 14 weeks on the Denmark Singles Top 40. It entered the chart on position 38 in the 47th week of 2007, its last appearance was in the 18th week of 2008. It peaked at number 21, where it stayed for 1 week.

In May 2008, Australia's national radio station Triple J put the single on its "Hit List" (songs on med-high rotation). The song also finished the year as the third most played song on the station.

References 

2007 singles
2007 songs